7x7 may refer to:

Boeing 7x7 series, Boeing's "7-Series" of airliners
Boeing 767, wide-body aircraft codenamed "7X7" during development
7x7 (magazine), a San Francisco-focused fashion, food, and entertainment magazine
7x7 (website), a Russian website
V-Cube 7, the 7×7×7 version of Rubik's Cube

See also
7 & 7
7/7